| 82 kg

Rosen Dimitrov (born May 10, 1982) is a Bulgarian Sambo practitioner who is three times world champion in Combat Sambo. He is the trainer of the Bulgarian national team of combat sambo. He is also a mixed martial artist. He has more than 20 MMA fights. With his twin brother Rumen Dimitrov they founded the organization TWINS MMA.

Mixed martial arts record

|-
|  Win
| align=center| 21-3
| Herman Kungu
| TKO (Doctor Stoppage)
| MAXFIGHT: Warriors 34
| 
| align=center| 1
| align=center| 3:16
| Sveti Vlas, Bulgaria
| 
|-
|  Win
| align=center| 20-3
| Aleksey Martinov
| Submission (Punches)
| Cage Of Glory 4
| 
| align=center| 2
| align=center| 
| Obzor, Bulgaria
| 
|-
|  Loss
| align=center| 19-3
| Ronny Alexander
| KO (Spinning Back Kick)
| MAXFIGHT: Warriors 31
| 
| align=center| 1
| align=center| 3:01
| Sofia, Bulgaria
| 
|-
|  Win
| align=center| 19-2
| Pavel Malazov
| TKO (Punches)
| MAXFIGHT: Warriors 28
| 
| align=center| 2
| align=center| 2:25
| Sofia, Bulgaria
| 
|-
|  Win
| align=center| 18-2
| Borche Ivanovski
| Submission (guillotine choke)
| MAXFIGHT: Warriors 27
| 
| align=center| 1
| align=center| 1:28
| Sofia, Bulgaria
| 
|-
|  Win
| align=center| 17-2
| Tikhon Delovski
| Submission (guillotine choke)
| BoG: Battle of Gabrovo
| 
| align=center| 1
| align=center| 
| Gabrovo, Bulgaria
| 
|-
|  Win
| align=center| 16-2
| Boyan Jekov
| Submission (achilles lock)
| BoG: Battle of Gabrovo
| 
| align=center| 1
| align=center| 
| Gabrovo, Bulgaria
| 
|-
|  Win
| align=center| 15-2
| Nikolai Alexiev
| Submission (rear-naked choke)
| BMMAF: Warriors 24
| 
| align=center| 2
| align=center| 2:44
| Sunny Beach, Bulgaria
| 
|-
|  Win
| align=center| 14-2
| Danijel Dzebic
| Submission (punches)
| RPC: Battle of the Fortress
| 
| align=center| 2
| align=center| 
| Veliko Tarnovo, Bulgaria
| 
|-
|  Win
| align=center| 13-2
| Jesus Rodriguez
| TKO (punches)
| MAXFIGHT-21
| 
| align=center| 1
| align=center| 3:15
| Sofia, Bulgaria
| 
|-
|  Win
| align=center| 12-2
| Ivica Trushchek
| Submission (guillotine)
| MAXFIGHT-19
| 
| align=center| 2
| align=center| 3:57
| Sofia, Bulgaria
| 
|-
|  Win
| align=center| 11-2
| Ivan Ivanov
| TKO (punches)
| MAXFIGHT-16
| 
| align=center| 2
| align=center| 3:15
| Sveti Vlas, Bulgaria
| 
|-
|  Win
| align=center| 10-2
| Deivison Ribeiro
| TKO (punches)
| MAXFIGHT-15
| 
| align=center| 3
| align=center| 3:35
| Sveti Vlas, Bulgaria
| 
|-
|  Win
| align=center| 9-2
| Riccardo Schiesaro
| Submission (achilles lock)
| Real Pain Challenge: Domination
| 
| align=center| 1
| align=center| 
| Sofia, Bulgaria
| 
|-
|  Win
| align=center| 8-2
| Lubomir Guedjev
| Decision (unanimous)
| BMMAF: Warriors 10
| 
| align=center| 3
| align=center| 5:00
| Kardzhali, Bulgaria
| 
|-
|  Win
| align=center| 7-2
| Ivan Brguljan
| Submission (rear-naked choke)
| BMMAF: Warriors 9
| 
| align=center| 1
| align=center| 2:10
| Sveti Vlas, Bulgaria
| 
|-
|  Win
| align=center| 6-2
| Mikko Suvanto
| Decision (majority)
| M-1 Challenge 17: Korea
| 
| align=center| 2
| align=center| 5:00
| Seoul, South Korea
| 
|-
|  Win
| align=center| 5-2
| Nikolay Dobrudzhanski
| Decision (unanimous)
| BMMAF: Warriors 7
| 
| align=center| 2
| align=center| 5:00
| Stara Zagora, Bulgaria
| 
|-
|  Loss
| align=center| 4-2
| Sergey Kornev
| TKO (punches)
| M-1 Challenge 7: UK
| 
| align=center| 1
| align=center| 2:59
| Nottingham, United Kingdom
| 
|-
|  Win
| align=center| 4-1
| Oliver Miller
| Submission (guillotine choke)
| RPC 2: Real Pain Challenge 2
| 
| align=center| 2
| align=center| 2:30
| Sofia, Bulgaria
| 
|-
|  Loss
| align=center| 3-1
| Jordan Radev
| Decision  (Unanimous)
| RPC 1: Real Pain Challenge 1
| 
| align=center| 3
| align=center| 5:00
| Sofia, Bulgaria
| 
|-
|  Win
| align=center| 3-0
| Loncar Andrija
| Submission (achilles lock)
| BCM: MMA Open Sofia
| 
| align=center| 1
| align=center| 1:21
| Sofia, Bulgaria
| 
|-
|  Win
| align=center| 2-0
| Nikolay Parchev
| Submission (verbal)
| Shooto: Bulgaria
| 
| align=center| 1
| align=center| n/a
| Sofia, Bulgaria
| 
|-
|  Win
| align=center| 1-0
| Petar Mateev
| Submission (guillotine choke)
| Shooto: Bulgaria
| 
| align=center| 1
| align=center| 2:15
| Sofia, Bulgaria
| MMA Debut

External links

Living people
Bulgarian male mixed martial artists
Welterweight mixed martial artists
Middleweight mixed martial artists
Bulgarian sambo practitioners
Sportspeople from Sofia
1982 births
Mixed martial artists utilizing sambo